Monochamus pictor is a species of beetle in the family Cerambycidae. It was described by Henry Walter Bates in 1884, originally under the genus Monohammus. It is known from the Democratic Republic of the Congo, Uganda, and Cameroon.

References

pictor
Beetles described in 1884